San Sai is a district (amphoe) in the central part of Chiang Mai province in northern Thailand.

History
During the annual rainy season (monsoons), the Ping and the Khao River carry sediment that accumulates at the confluence of the two rivers, forming large dunes. This area is now the site of the San Sai District office. When the Siamese government of created this district on 20 October 1897, they named it San Sai. San is the Thai word for 'dune', and sai means 'sand'.

Geography
Neighboring districts are (from the north clockwise) Mae Taeng, Doi Saket, San Kamphaeng, Mueang Chiang Mai and Mae Rim and of Chiang Mai Province.

Administration
The district is divided into 12 sub-districts (tambons), which are further subdivided into 116 villages (mubans). There are two townships (thesaban tambons): San Sai Luang covers parts of tambons San Sai Luang, San Sai Noi, San Phranet, and Pa Phai; Mae Cho parts of tambons Nong Chom, Nong Han, and Pa Phai. There are a further 10 tambon administrative organizations (TAO).

External links
amphoe.com

San Sai